Mohammad Mohammadian is an Iranian film director, screenwriter, photographer and producer. He became interested in cinema in his teenage years and started his filmmaking education with the Iranian grandmaster of cinema Abbas Kiarostami whose cinematic style has been an influence.

Awards and nominations

See also 

 Film festival
Academy of Motion Picture Arts and Sciences
List of awards and nominations received by Steven Spielberg
 List of awards won by Abbas Kiarostami

References

External links 

 

Mohammadian
Mohammadian